The Evil Rises is a 2018 horror film written and directed by Daniel Florenzano in his feature film debut. The film stars Bailey La Flam, Michael Glauser, Julian De Mora and Joe Paulson.

Plot 
An ancient statue possessed by an evil spirit terrorizes a group of young kids on its quest for world domination.

Cast 

 Bailey La Flam
 Michael Glauser
 Julian De La Mora
 Joe Paulson
 Alec Lobato
 Ed Hollingsworth

Production 
The film is Florenzano's feature length debut and shot in San Diego.

Release 
The Evil Rises was distributed by Terror Films. It was released on Tubi for a period of time before branching out to other platforms including JoBlo's YouTube channel.

Reception 
The film won Best Horror Film at Hollywood Reel Independent Film Festival.

Critical response

Cryptic Rock said it is a "decent low budget," giving it 4 out of 5 stars. Voices From The Balcony claims it's "the kind of stupid that kicked off so many of the 80s films" and scored it 3.5 out of 5. Movies and Mania rated it 2 out of 5 stars.

References

External links 
 Official Website
 
 

2018 horror films
2018 directorial debut films
Films set in San Diego
Films shot in San Diego
Films released on YouTube
2018 independent films
American independent films
Films about spirit possession
American teen horror films
American comedy horror films
American supernatural horror films
2018 comedy horror films
2010s supernatural horror films
2010s teen horror films
Films about witchcraft